Shepherd's Bush Market is a London Underground station in the district of Shepherd's Bush in west London, England. It is on the Circle and Hammersmith & City Lines, between Goldhawk Road and Wood Lane stations, and it is in Travelcard Zone 2. Shepherd's Bush Market, from which the station takes its name, is an open-air market which runs parallel to the railway line.

History

The Metropolitan Railway (MR) opened the original station on 13 June 1864 as Shepherd's Bush on its new extension to Hammersmith. It was in the Shepherd's Bush Market area just south of Uxbridge Road. From 1 October 1877 until 31 December 1906 the MR also ran direct services along this line to Richmond via .

The original Shepherd's Bush station closed in 1914 to be replaced by two new stations which opened on 1 April 1914: the new Shepherd's Bush station resited a short distance north across the Uxbridge Road, and Goldhawk Road about half a kilometre to the south. Those stations remain in those locations but nothing exists of the former station buildings in the marketplace.

In 1900 the Central London Railway (CLR) opened its Shepherd's Bush station, now the Central line station, at the other end of Shepherd's Bush Green.

In 2008 the new London Overground Shepherd's Bush railway station was opened on the West London Line. To avoid the confusion of three stations named Shepherd's Bush, the Hammersmith & City line station was renamed Shepherd's Bush Market on 12 October 2008. The other two on the Central line and the West London line are close to each other and interchange is allowed, but not with Shepherd's Bush Market tube station.

Locale
The station is at the western end of Shepherd's Bush Green, and stands just across the road from the marketplace which gives it its name. Stallholders have traded on the strip of land beside the Hammersmith & City line since 1914, when the market took over the station's first site. The other end of the market is served by Goldhawk Road Underground station.

Shepherd's Bush Market station is the nearest Underground stop to various entertainment venues including the Bush Theatre and the Shepherd's Bush Empire. It is also one of the Underground stations which serve Loftus Road Football Stadium, the home of Queens Park Rangers football club. Westfield and West12 shopping centres are near the station.

Connections
London Buses routes 207, 260, 283 and 607 and night route N207 serve the station.

See also
Shepherd's Bush Market
Shepherd's Bush stations

References

External links

 
 , note Metropolitan line style diamond "roundel".
 

Circle line (London Underground) stations
Hammersmith & City line stations
Tube stations in the London Borough of Hammersmith and Fulham
Former Hammersmith and City Railway stations
Railway stations in Great Britain opened in 1864
Railway stations in Great Britain closed in 1914
Railway stations in Great Britain opened in 1914
Shepherd's Bush